Nenad Zimonjić and Samantha Stosur were the defending champions, but Stosur chose not to participate this year. Zimonjić played alongside Jarmila Gajdošová, but lost in the third round to Robert Lindstedt and Anabel Medina Garrigues.

Seventh seeded Leander Paes and Martina Hingis won the title, defeating Alexander Peya and Tímea Babos in the final 6–1, 6–1.

Seeds
All seeds received a bye into the second round.

Draw

Finals

Top half

Section 1

Section 2

Bottom half

Section 3

Section 4

External links
 Main draw
2015 Wimbledon Championships – Doubles draws and results at the International Tennis Federation

X=Mixed Doubles
Wimbledon Championship by year – Mixed doubles